John Willis Fleming (28 November 1781 – 4 September 1844) was an English landed proprietor and Conservative  Member of Parliament.

He was born at Bletchley in Buckinghamshire, the son of Rev. Thomas Willis and Catherine Hyde. He was educated at Eton College. He was the great grandson of the antiquary Browne Willis, and of Benedict Calvert, 4th Baron Baltimore and Charlotte Lee, Lady Baltimore. In 1813 he changed his name by Private Act of Parliament from John Fleming Barton Willis to John Fleming, and he was also known thereafter as John Willis Fleming. In 1813 he married Christopheria Buchanan, by whom he had four sons and four daughters. He was High Sheriff of Hampshire in 1817. He was elected Member of Parliament for Hampshire in 1820, and again in 1826 and 1830; and jointly with Henry Combe Compton for South Hampshire in 1835, 1837, and 1841.

John Willis Fleming died at Athens, Greece on 18 July 1844, and was buried at St. Nicolas' Church, North Stoneham in Hampshire, near his seat Stoneham Park. The memorial tablet in St. Nicolas was carved by Richard Cockle Lucas of Chilworth.

References

 The Willis Fleming Historical Trust: papers and biographical file
 Brown, David, Palmerston, South Hampshire and Electoral Politics, 1832-1835. Hampshire Papers 26 (Winchester, 2003)

External links
 The Willis Fleming Historical Trust

External links 
 

1781 births
1844 deaths
Conservative Party (UK) MPs for English constituencies
High Sheriffs of Hampshire
UK MPs 1820–1826
UK MPs 1826–1830
UK MPs 1830–1831
UK MPs 1835–1837
UK MPs 1837–1841
UK MPs 1841–1847
People educated at Eton College
Tory MPs (pre-1834)
People from North Stoneham